George Gard "Buddy" DeSylva (January 27, 1895 – July 11, 1950) was an American songwriter, film producer and record executive. He wrote or co-wrote many popular songs and, along with Johnny Mercer and Glenn Wallichs, he co-founded Capitol Records.

Biography
DeSylva was born in New York City, but grew up in California, and attended the University of Southern California, where he joined the Theta Xi Fraternity.

His Portuguese-born father, Aloysius J. De Sylva, was better known to American audiences as actor Hal De Forrest. His father was also a lawyer as well as an actor. His mother, Georgetta Miles Gard, was the daughter of Los Angeles police chief George E. Gard.

DeSylva's first successful songs were those used by Al Jolson on Broadway in the 1918 production of Sinbad, which included "I'll Say She Does". Soon thereafter, he met Jolson and in 1918 the pair went to New York and DeSylva began working as a songwriter in Tin Pan Alley.

In the early 1920s, DeSylva frequently worked with composer George Gershwin. Together, they created the  experimental one-act jazz opera Blue Monday set in Harlem, which is widely regarded as a forerunner to Porgy and Bess ten years later.

In April 1924, DeSylva married Marie Wallace, a Ziegfeld Follies dancer.

In 1925, DeSylva became one third of the songwriting team with lyricist Lew Brown and composer Ray Henderson, one of the top Tin Pan Alley songwriters of the era. The team was responsible for the song "Magnolia" (1927) which was popularized by Lou Gold's orchestra. The writing and publishing partnership continued until 1930, producing a string of hits and the perennial Broadway favorite Good News.

DeSylva joined ASCAP in 1920 and served on the ASCAP board of directors between 1922 and 1930. He became a producer of stage and screen musicals. DeSylva relocated to Hollywood and was contracted to Fox Studios.

During this tenure, he produced movies such as The Little Colonel, The Littlest Rebel, Captain January, Poor Little Rich Girl and Stowaway. In 1941, he became the Executive Producer at Paramount Pictures, a position he would hold until 1944. At Paramount, he was also an uncredited executive producer for Double Indemnity, For Whom the Bell Tolls, The Story of Dr. Wassell and The Glass Key.  Betty Hutton always credited DeSylva for bringing her to Hollywood and launching her film career.

The Paramount all-star extravaganza Star Spangled Rhythm, which takes place at the Paramount film studio in Hollywood, features a fictional movie executive named "B.G. DeSoto" (played by Walter Abel) who is a parody of DeSylva.

In 1942, Johnny Mercer, Glenn Wallichs and DeSylva together founded Capitol Records. He also founded the Cowboy label.

He is sometimes credited as: Buddy De Sylva, Buddy DeSylva, Bud De Sylva, Buddy G. DeSylva and B.G. DeSylva.

Buddy DeSylva died in Hollywood, aged 55, and is buried at Glendale's Forest Lawn Memorial Park Cemetery.

Individual songs
Desylva, Buddy, B. G. De Sylva, Lew Brown, and Ray Henderson. Seven Veils. 26 March 1927
Desylva, Buddy, B. G. De Sylva, Lew Brown, and Ray Henderson. Good News: vocal selection. [Place of publication not identified]: Chappell, n.d.  
Henderson, Ray, B. G. De Sylva, and Bud Green. "Alabamy Bound". New York: Shapiro, Bernstein & Co, 1925.  
De Sylva, B. G., Lew Brown, and Ray Henderson. "Magnolia". 1927.  
 "Avalon"
 "April Showers"
 "The Best Things in Life Are Free"
 "The Birth of the Blues"
 "Button Up Your Overcoat"
 "California, Here I Come"
 "If You Knew Susie"
 "It All Depends on You"
 "Look for the Silver Lining"
 "Somebody Loves Me"
 "Sonny Boy"
 "The Varsity Drag" 
 "You're the Cream in My Coffee"

Broadway credits
1919 - La La Lucille (music by George Gershwin)
1922 - George White's Scandals of 1922 (music by George Gershwin, and included premiere of one-act jazz opera Blue Monday)
1922 - Orange Blossoms (music by Victor Herbert)
1922 - The Yankee Princess (music by Emmerich Kalman)
1923 - George White's Scandals of 1923 (music by George Gershwin)
1924 - Sweet Little Devil (music by George Gershwin)
1924 - George White's Scandals of 1924 music by George Gershwin
1925 - Big Boy (music by Joseph Meyer and James F. Hanley)
1925 - Tell Me More! (co-lyricist with Ira Gershwin music by George Gershwin)
1925 - George White's Scandals of 1925 (DeSylva, Brown and Henderson)
1925 - Captain Jinks (music by Lewis Gensler)
1926 - George White's Scandals of 1926 (DeSylva, Brown and Henderson)
1926 - Queen High (music by Lewis Gensler)
1927 - Good News (DeSylva, Brown and Henderson)
1927 - Manhattan Mary (DeSylva, Brown and Henderson)
1928 - George White's Scandals of 1928 (DeSylva, Brown and Henderson)
1928 - Hold Everything! (DeSylva, Brown and Henderson)
1929 - Follow Thru (DeSylva, Brown and Henderson)
1930 - Flying High (DeSylva, Brown and Henderson)
1932 - Take a Chance (music by Nacio Herb Brown, Richard A. Whiting and Vincent Youmans)

Selected filmography
 Stepping Sisters  (1932)
 My Weakness (1933)
 The Stork Club (1945)

In popular culture
The 1956 Hollywood film The Best Things in Life Are Free, starring Gordon MacRae, Dan Dailey, and Ernest Borgnine, depicted the De Sylva, Brown and Henderson collaboration.

References

Further reading

 Ewen, David (1970). Great Men of American Popular Song ASIN: B000OKLHXU
 Green, Stanley (1984). The World Of Musical Comedy. Publisher: Da Capo Press.

External links

Buddy DeSylva and the 1909 Copyright Act
Buddy DeSylva at the Internet Archive
Buddy De Sylva recordings at the Discography of American Historical Recordings.

1895 births
1950 deaths
American people of Portuguese descent
Broadway composers and lyricists
Burials at Forest Lawn Memorial Park (Glendale)
Capitol Records
Musicians from New York City
People from Greater Los Angeles
Songwriters from New York (state)
University of Southern California alumni
20th-century American musicians